The Journal of Medical Practice Management is a medical journal published by Greenbranch Publishing. It is abstracted and indexed in MEDLINE, BIOSIS, Embase/Excerpta Medica, and Hospital Literature Index. The journal was established in 1984 and is published by Greenbranch Publishing.

References

External links
 

Publications established in 1984
Healthcare journals
Bimonthly journals
English-language journals